The 2014 Canberra United FC season was the club's seventh participation in the W-League, since the league's formation in 2008.

Players

Squad information

Transfers in

Transfers out

Technical staff

Competitions

W-League

Fixtures

League table

Results summary

Results by round

Goal scorers

W-League Finals series

Awards
 Player of the Week (Round 1) - Michelle Heyman
 Player of the Week (Round 9) - Stephanie Ochs
 Player of the Week (Round 12) - Ashleigh Sykes
 Grand Final Man of the Match - Ashleigh Sykes

References

External links
 Official Website

Canberra United FC seasons
Canberra United